Le Puy-en-Velay Football 43 Auvergne (commonly referred to as Le Puy) is a French football club based in Le Puy-en-Velay in the Auvergne region. It competes in the Championnat National, the third tier of French football.

The club was founded in 1903 under the name AS Le Puy. Since its foundation, the club has changed its name numerous times. In 1974, the club changed its name to CO Le Puy and, 17 years later, changed its name to SCO Le Puy. The following year, Le Puy changed its name to USF Le Puy and, in 2009, merged with another local club, AS Taulhac, to form the club that exists today. Despite being an amateur club today, Le Puy did have a stint in the professional division of Ligue 2 spending five seasons in the league during the 1980s.

Current squad

Out on loan

References

External links
 

Association football clubs established in 1903
1903 establishments in France
Sport in Haute-Loire
Football clubs in Auvergne-Rhône-Alpes